Philippine Kaskele (1742–1811), was a German Court Jew banker.   She took over the position of hoffaktoren or banker of the Court of Saxony from her spouse Jacob Kaskele in 1788–1808 during the minority of her son Michael Kaskel.

Weblinks
 Stadtwiki Dresden: Philippine Kaskele
 Stadtwiki Dresden: Jacob Kaskele
 Wikipedia: Michael Kaskel
 Joachim Felix Kaskel: VOM HOFFAKTOR ZUR DRESDNER BANK. DIE UNTERNEHMERFAMILIE KASKEL IM 18. UND 19. JAHRHUNDERT, in: Zeitschrift für Unternehmensgeschichte / Journal of Business History, 28. Jahrg., H. 3. (1983), pp. 159-187

References

1811 deaths
18th-century German businesswomen
18th-century German businesspeople
1742 births
18th-century German Jews
Court Jews